Defending champion Diede de Groot and her partner Marjolein Buis defeated Sabine Ellerbrock and Aniek van Koot in the final, 6–2, 6–4 to win the women's title at the 2017 Wheelchair Doubles Masters.

De Groot and Lucy Shuker were the defending champions, but did not compete together this year. Shuker partnered Dana Mathewson, but was defeated in the semifinals by Ellerbrock and van Koot.

Seeds

  Marjolein Buis /  Diede de Groot (champions)
  Dana Mathewson /  Lucy Shuker (semifinals, third place)
  Sabine Ellerbrock /  Aniek van Koot (final)
  Charlotte Famin /  Kgothatso Montjane (semifinals, fourth place)
  Giulia Capocci /  Katharina Krüger (round robin)
  Louise Hunt /  Michaela Spaanstra (round robin)

Draw

Finals

Group A

Group B

References

External links

Women's doubles draw

Masters, 2017